Juan Herminio Cintrón García (11 March 1919 – 22 September 2012) was a Puerto Rican politician and Mayor of Ponce, Puerto Rico, from 1968 to 1972. Under his administration the city of Ponce saw the construction of the Coliseo Juan "Pachín" Vicéns and the Centro Gubernamental de Ponce on Avenida Las Americas.

Early years
Cintron García was born in Ponce, Puerto Rico in 1919. He was the second child of Arturo Cintrón Gonzalez, a businessman, and Herminia Garcia Mercado, a school teacher. He attended elementary and middle school in Ponce public schools and graduated from Ponce High School in 1936. After performing in the business of his father for several years, he earned his bachelor's degree in business administration from Universidad Católica de Puerto Rico in 1971. He was concurrently acting as mayor of Ponce while he did his college work. On 3 February 1946, he married Elba Cintron Ruiz.

Career

Cintron served as mayor Ponce from 1969 to 1973. During his administration the city built the Juan Pachín Vicéns Auditorium, moved the Ponce Municipal Library to a new facility next to Teatro La Perla, re-organized the Archivo Histórico de Ponce, enlarged the Avenida Las Américas roadway, and opened the Centro Gubernamental de Ponce at Avenida Las Americas and Avenida Hostos. Under his administration the Francisco Montaner Stadium was also remodeled.

Two other projects inaugurated during his administration were the new Puerto Rico Police regional headquarters on Avenida Hostos and the start of the construction of the University of Puerto Rico at Ponce on Ponce Bypass and PR-12. In addition to commencing construction of the University of Puerto Rico at Ponce, for which the Ponce Municipal Government provided $250,000, Cintron Garcia also rebuilt the aging Hospital Municipal Tricoche.

After his mayoral service, Cintron Garcia served as Puerto Rico's Secretary of Commerce from 1977 to 1984 under Governor Carlos Romero Barceló. From 1992 to 1997 he served as municipal assemblyman in Ponce.

Cintron Garcia was a founding member of the Ponce YMCA. He also served in its board performing as vicepresident for two years. He was also vicepresident of the Club de Leones de Ponce (the Ponce chapter of the Lions Club International).

Legacy
On 4 February 2011, the PNP-controlled Puerto Rico Senate approved a bill to name the Centro de Convenciones de Ponce (Ponce Convention Center) after Cintron Garcia. However, on 3 February 2011, the bill had been denounced by Ramón Torres Morales, president of the PPD in Ponce, for allegedly conflicting with the Law of Autonomous Municipalities of Puerto Rico.
On 23 June 2011 the bill was passed.

Death
Juan H. Cintron died in Ponce on 22 September 2012. He was buried at Ponce's Cementerio La Piedad at Barrio Magueyes in Ponce, Puerto Rico.

Honors
Cintron Garcia is honored at Ponce's Park of Illustrious Ponce Citizens.  Only six, of over 100 Ponce mayors, are honored there. A street was named after him at Urbanizacion Estancias del Golf in Ponce. The Puerto Rico & Virgin Islands chapter of the American Legion dedicated its 89th convention in his honor in June 2012. In 2012, the Complejo Ferial de Puerto Rico was renamed Complejo Ferial de Puerto Rico Juan H. Cintron in his honor.

See also
 Ponce, Puerto Rico
 List of Puerto Ricans
 List of mayors of Ponce, Puerto Rico

Further reading
 Biografia Completa de Juan H. Cintrón García. Ileana Cintrón Cintrón. March 2013. Ponce, Puerto Rico.
 Fay Fowlie de Flores. Ponce, Perla del Sur: Una Bibliográfica Anotada. Second Edition. 1997. Ponce, Puerto Rico: Universidad de Puerto Rico en Ponce. p. 173. Item 880. 
 Carnaval de Ponce: programa. Ponce, Puerto Rico. 196x? - . Includes photos. (Archivo Histórico Municipal de Ponce, AHMP; Colegio Universitario Tecnológico de Ponce, CUTPO)

References

1919 births
2012 deaths
Burials at Cementerio La Piedad
Mayors of Ponce, Puerto Rico
National Guard (United States) officers
New Progressive Party (Puerto Rico) politicians
Pontifical Catholic University of Puerto Rico alumni
Puerto Rican military officers
Puerto Rico National Guard personnel
United States Army officers
YMCA leaders